Godzilla is a fictional monster, or kaiju, in Toho Co., Ltd.'s eponymous media franchise. The character debuted in the self-titled 1954 film, directed and co-written by Ishirō Honda; the character had become an international pop culture icon since, appearing in various media: 33 Japanese films produced by Toho, five American films and numerous video games, novels, comic books and television shows. Godzilla has been dubbed the "King of the Monsters", an epithet first used in Godzilla, King of the Monsters! (1956), the American localization of the 1954 film.

Godzilla is a prehistoric reptilian monster awakened and empowered by nuclear radiation. With the nuclear bombings of Hiroshima and Nagasaki and the Lucky Dragon 5 incident still fresh in the Japanese consciousness, Godzilla was conceived as a metaphor for nuclear weapons. Others have suggested that Godzilla is a metaphor for the United States, a giant beast woken from its slumber which then takes terrible vengeance on Japan. As the film series expanded, some stories took on less serious undertones, portraying Godzilla as an antihero, or a lesser threat who defends humanity. Later films address disparate themes and commentary including Japan's apathy and neglect of its imperial past, natural disasters, and the human condition.

Godzilla has been featured alongside many supporting characters. It has faced human opponents such as the JSDF, or other monsters, including King Ghidorah, Mechagodzilla and Gigan. Godzilla sometimes has allies, such as Rodan, Mothra and Anguirus, and offspring, such as Minilla and Godzilla Junior. Godzilla has also fought characters from other franchises in crossover media, such as King Kong, as well as various Marvel Comics characters, including S.H.I.E.L.D., the Fantastic Four and the Avengers.

Overview

Name
According to an episode of the Japanese television documentary series Project X entitled "The Birth of Godzilla", special effects director Eiji Tsuburaya met Toho contract actor Shiro Amikura in the Toho Studios cafeteria and nicknamed him "Gojira," combining the Japanese words for gorilla (since he thought Amikura looked like a Gorilla) and whale (since Amikura told Tsuburaya that whale meat was his favorite food). In a 1998 BBC documentary on Godzilla, Kimi Honda, the widow of the 1954 film's director Ishirō Honda, dismissed the employee-name story as a tall tale, believing that Honda, Tanaka, and Tsuburaya gave "considerable thought" to the name of the monster, stating, "the backstage boys at Toho loved to joke around with tall stories, but I don't believe that one".

During the development of the American version of Godzilla Raids Again (1955), Godzilla's name was changed to "Gigantis" by producer Paul Schreibman, who wanted to create a character distinct from Godzilla.

Characteristics

Within the context of the Japanese films, Godzilla's exact origins vary, but it is generally depicted as an enormous, violent, prehistoric sea monster awakened and empowered by nuclear radiation. Although the specific details of Godzilla's appearance have varied slightly over the years, the overall impression has remained consistent. Inspired by the fictional Rhedosaurus created by animator Ray Harryhausen for the film The Beast from 20,000 Fathoms, Godzilla's character design was conceived as that of an amphibious reptilian monster based around the loose concept of a dinosaur with an erect standing posture, scaly skin, an anthropomorphic torso with muscular arms, lobed bony plates along its back and tail, and a furrowed brow.

Art director Akira Watanabe combined attributes of a Tyrannosaurus, an Iguanodon, a Stegosaurus and an alligator to form a sort of blended chimera, inspired by illustrations from an issue of Life magazine. To emphasise the monster's relationship with the atomic bomb, its skin texture was inspired by the keloid scars seen on the survivors of Hiroshima. The basic design has a reptilian visage, a robust build, an upright posture, a long tail and three rows of serrated plates along the back. In the original film, the plates were added for purely aesthetic purposes, in order to further differentiate Godzilla from any other living or extinct creature. Godzilla is sometimes depicted as green in comics, cartoons and movie posters, but the costumes used in the movies were usually painted charcoal grey with bone-white dorsal plates up until the film Godzilla 2000: Millennium.

In the original Japanese films, Godzilla and all the other monsters are referred to with gender-neutral pronouns equivalent to "it", while in the English dubbed versions, Godzilla is explicitly described as a male. In his book, Godzilla co-creator Tomoyuki Tanaka suggested that the monster was probably male. In the 1998 film Godzilla, the monster is referred to as a male and is depicted laying eggs through parthenogenesis. In the Legendary Godzilla films, Godzilla is referred to as a male.

Godzilla's allegiance and motivations have changed from film to film to suit the needs of the story. Although Godzilla does not like humans, it will fight alongside humanity against common threats. However, it makes no special effort to protect human life or property and will turn against its human allies on a whim. It is not motivated to attack by predatory instinct: it does not eat people and instead sustains itself on nuclear radiation and an omnivorous diet. When inquired if Godzilla was "good or bad", producer Shōgo Tomiyama likened it to a Shinto "God of Destruction" which lacks moral agency and cannot be held to human standards of good and evil. "He totally destroys everything and then there is a rebirth. Something new and fresh can begin."

Abilities

Godzilla's signature weapon is its "atomic heat beam" (also known as "atomic breath"), nuclear energy that it generates inside of its body, uses electromagnetic force to concentrate it into a laser-like hypersonic projectile and unleashes it from its jaws in the form of a blue or red radioactive beam. Toho's special effects department has used various techniques to render the beam, from physical gas-powered flames to hand-drawn or computer-generated fire. Godzilla is shown to possess immense physical strength and muscularity. Haruo Nakajima, the actor who played Godzilla in the original films, was a black belt in judo and used his expertise to choreograph the battle sequences.

Godzilla is amphibious: it has a preference for traversing Earth's hydrosphere when in hibernation or migration, can breathe underwater and is described in the original film by the character Dr. Yamane as a transitional form between a marine and a terrestrial reptile. Godzilla is shown to have great vitality: it is immune to conventional weaponry thanks to its rugged hide and ability to regenerate, and as a result of surviving a nuclear explosion, it cannot be destroyed by anything less powerful. One incarnation possesses an electromagnetic pulse-producing organ in its body which generates an asymmetrical permeable shield, making it impervious to all damage except for a short period when the organ recycles.

Various films, non-canonical television shows, comics and games have depicted Godzilla with additional powers, such as an atomic pulse, magnetism, precognition, fireballs, convert electromagnetic energy into intensive body heat, converting shed blood into temporary tentacle limbs, an electric bite, superhuman speed, laser beams emitted from its eyes and even flight.

Roar
Godzilla has a distinctive disyllabic roar (transcribed in several comics as Skreeeonk!), which was created by composer Akira Ifukube, who produced the sound by rubbing a pine tar-resin-coated glove along the string of a contrabass and then slowing down the playback. In the American version of Godzilla Raids Again (1955) titled Gigantis the Fire Monster (1959), Godzilla's roar was mostly substituted with that of the monster Anguirus. From The Return of Godzilla (1984) to Godzilla vs. King Ghidorah (1991), Godzilla was given a deeper and more threatening-sounding roar than in previous films, though this change was reverted from Godzilla vs. Mothra (1992) onward. For the 2014 American film, sound editors Ethan Van der Ryn and Erik Aadahl refused to disclose the source of the sounds used for their Godzilla's roar. Aadahl described the two syllables of the roar as representing two different emotional reactions, with the first expressing fury and the second conveying the character's soul.

Size

Godzilla's size is inconsistent, changing from film to film and even from scene to scene for the sake of artistic license. The miniature sets and costumes were typically built at a – scale and filmed at 240 frames per second to create the illusion of great size. This was done so Godzilla could just peer over the largest buildings in Tokyo at the time.

This was done so that it would not be dwarfed by the newer, bigger buildings in Tokyo's skyline, such as the  Tokyo Metropolitan Government Building which Godzilla destroyed in the film Godzilla vs. King Ghidorah (1991).

In the American film Godzilla (2014) from Legendary Pictures, Godzilla was scaled to be  and weighing , making it the largest film version at that time. Director Gareth Edwards wanted Godzilla "to be so big as to be seen from anywhere in the city, but not too big that he couldn't be obscured".

Special effects details

Godzilla's appearance has traditionally been portrayed in the films by an actor wearing a latex costume, though the character has also been rendered in animatronic, stop-motion and computer-generated form. Taking inspiration from King Kong, special effects artist Eiji Tsuburaya had initially wanted Godzilla to be portrayed via stop-motion, but prohibitive deadlines and a lack of experienced animators in Japan at the time made suitmation more practical.

The first suit consisted of a body cavity made of thin wires and bamboo wrapped in chicken wire for support and covered in fabric and cushions, which were then coated in latex. The first suit was held together by small hooks on the back, though subsequent Godzilla suits incorporated a zipper. Prior to 1984, most Godzilla suits were made from scratch, thus resulting in slight design changes in each film appearance. The most notable changes from 1962 to 1975 were the reduction in Godzilla's number of toes and the removal of the character's external ears and prominent fangs, features which would all later be reincorporated in the Godzilla designs from The Return of Godzilla (1984) onward. The most consistent Godzilla design was maintained from Godzilla vs. Biollante (1989) to Godzilla vs. Destoroyah (1995), when the suit was given a cat-like face and double rows of teeth.

Several suit actors had difficulties in performing as Godzilla due to the suits' weight, lack of ventilation and diminished visibility. Haruo Nakajima, who portrayed Godzilla from 1954 to 1972, said the materials used to make the 1954 suit (rubber, plastic, cotton, and latex) were hard to find after World War II. The suit weighed 100 kilograms after its completion and required two men to help Nakajima put it on. When he first put it on, he sweated so heavily that his shirt was soaked within seconds.

Kenpachiro Satsuma in particular, who portrayed Godzilla from 1984 to 1995, described how the Godzilla suits he wore were even heavier and hotter than their predecessors because of the incorporation of animatronics. Satsuma himself suffered numerous medical issues during his tenure, including oxygen deprivation, near-drowning, concussions, electric shocks and lacerations to the legs from the suits' steel wire reinforcements wearing through the rubber padding.

The ventilation problem was partially solved in the suit used in 1994's Godzilla vs. SpaceGodzilla, which was the first to include an air duct that allowed suit actors to last longer during performances. In The Return of Godzilla (1984), some scenes made use of a 16-foot high robotic Godzilla (dubbed the "Cybot Godzilla") for use in close-up shots of the creature's head. The Cybot Godzilla consisted of a hydraulically-powered mechanical endoskeleton covered in urethane skin containing 3,000 computer operated parts which permitted it to tilt its head and move its lips and arms.

In Godzilla (1998), special effects artist Patrick Tatopoulos was instructed to redesign Godzilla as an incredibly fast runner. At one point, it was planned to use motion capture from a human to create the movements of the computer-generated Godzilla, but it was said to have ended up looking too much like a man in a suit. Tatopoulos subsequently reimagined the creature as a lean, digitigrade bipedal, iguana-like creature that stood with its back and tail parallel to the ground, rendered via CGI.

Several scenes had the monster portrayed by stuntmen in suits. The suits were similar to those used in the Toho films, with the actors' heads being located in the monster's neck region and the facial movements controlled via animatronics. The film's special effects crew also built a  scale animatronic Godzilla for close-up scenes, whose size outmatched that of Stan Winston's T. rex in Jurassic Park. Kurt Carley performed the suitmation sequences for the adult Godzilla.

In Godzilla (2014), the character was portrayed entirely via CGI. Godzilla's design in the reboot was intended to stay true to that of the original series, though the film's special effects team strove to make the monster "more dynamic than a guy in a big rubber suit." To create a CG version of Godzilla, the Moving Picture Company (MPC) studied various animals such as bears, Komodo dragons, lizards, lions and wolves, which helped the visual effects artists visualize Godzilla's body structure, like that of its underlying bone, fat and muscle structure, as well as the thickness and texture of its scales. Motion capture was also used for some of Godzilla's movements. T. J. Storm provided the performance capture for Godzilla by wearing sensors in front of a green screen. Storm reprised the role of Godzilla in Godzilla: King of the Monsters, portraying the character through performance capture. In Shin Godzilla, a majority of the character was portrayed via CGI, with Mansai Nomura portraying Godzilla through motion capture.

Appearances

Cultural impact

Godzilla is one of the most recognizable symbols of Japanese popular culture worldwide and remains an important facet of Japanese films, embodying the kaiju subset of the tokusatsu genre. Godzilla's vaguely humanoid appearance and strained, lumbering movements endeared it to Japanese audiences, who could relate to Godzilla as a sympathetic character, despite its wrathful nature. Audiences respond positively to the character because it acts out of rage and self-preservation and shows where science and technology can go wrong.

In 1967, the Keukdong Entertainment Company of South Korea, with production assistance from Toei Company, produced Yongary, Monster from the Deep, a reptilian monster who invades South Korea to consume oil. The film and character has often been branded as an imitation of Godzilla.

Godzilla has been considered a filmographic metaphor for the United States, as well as an allegory of nuclear weapons in general. The earlier Godzilla films, especially the original, portrayed Godzilla as a frightening nuclear-spawned monster. Godzilla represented the fears that many Japanese held about the atomic bombings of Hiroshima and Nagasaki and the possibility of recurrence.

As the series progressed, so did Godzilla, changing into a less destructive and more heroic character. Ghidorah (1964) was the turning point in Godzilla's transformation from villain to hero, by pitting him against a greater threat to humanity, King Ghidorah. Godzilla has since been viewed as an anti-hero. Roger Ebert cites Godzilla as a notable example of a villain-turned-hero, along with King Kong, Jaws (James Bond), the Terminator and John Rambo.

Godzilla is considered "the original radioactive superhero" due to his accidental radioactive origin story predating Spider-Man (1962 debut), though Godzilla did not become a hero until Ghidorah in 1964. By the 1970s, Godzilla came to be viewed as a superhero, with the magazine King of the Monsters in 1977 describing Godzilla as "Superhero of the '70s." Godzilla had surpassed Superman and Batman to become "the most universally popular superhero of 1977" according to Donald F. Glut. Godzilla was also voted the most popular movie monster in The Monster Times poll in 1973, beating Count Dracula, King Kong, the Wolf Man, the Mummy, the Creature from the Black Lagoon and the Frankenstein Monster.

In 1996, Godzilla received the MTV Lifetime Achievement Award, as well as being given a star on the Hollywood Walk of Fame in 2004 to celebrate the premiere of the character's 50th anniversary film, Godzilla: Final Wars. Godzilla's pop-cultural impact has led to the creation of numerous parodies and tributes, as seen in media such as Bambi Meets Godzilla, which was ranked as one of the "50 greatest cartoons", two episodes of Mystery Science Theater 3000 and the song "Godzilla" by Blue Öyster Cult. Godzilla has also been used in advertisements, such as in a commercial for Nike, where Godzilla lost an oversized one-on-one game of basketball to a giant version of NBA player Charles Barkley. The commercial was subsequently adapted into a comic book illustrated by Jeff Butler. Godzilla has also appeared in a commercial for Snickers candy bars, which served as an indirect promo for the 2014 film. Godzilla's success inspired the creation of numerous other monster characters, such as Gamera, Reptilicus of Denmark, Yonggary of South Korea, Pulgasari of North Korea, Gorgo of the United Kingdom and the Cloverfield monster of the United States.
Dakosaurus is an extinct sea crocodile of the Jurassic Period, which researchers informally nicknamed "Godzilla". Paleontologists have written tongue-in-cheek speculative articles about Godzilla's biology, with Ken Carpenter tentatively classifying it as a ceratosaur based on its skull shape, four-fingered hands and dorsal scutes and paleontologist Darren Naish expressing skepticism, while commenting on Godzilla's unusual morphology.

Godzilla's ubiquity in pop-culture has led to the mistaken assumption that the character is in the public domain, resulting in litigation by Toho to protect their corporate asset from becoming a generic trademark. In April 2008, Subway depicted a giant monster in a commercial for their Five Dollar Footlongs sandwich promotion. Toho filed a lawsuit against Subway for using the character without permission, demanding $150,000 in compensation. In February 2011, Toho sued Honda for depicting a fire-breathing monster in a commercial for the Honda Odyssey. The monster was never mentioned by name, being seen briefly on a video screen inside the minivan. The Sea Shepherd Conservation Society christened a vessel the MV Gojira. Its purpose is to target and harass Japanese whalers in defense of whales in the Southern Ocean Whale Sanctuary. Gojira is the name of a French death metal band, formerly known as Godzilla; legal problems forced the band to change their name. In May 2015, Toho launched a lawsuit against Voltage Pictures over a planned picture starring Anne Hathaway. Promotional material released at the Cannes Film Festival used images of Godzilla.

Steven Spielberg cited Godzilla as an inspiration for Jurassic Park (1993), specifically Godzilla, King of the Monsters! (1956), which he grew up watching. Spielberg described Godzilla as "the most masterful of all the dinosaur movies because it made you believe it was really happening." Godzilla also influenced the Spielberg film Jaws (1975). Godzilla has also been cited as an inspiration by filmmakers Martin Scorsese and Tim Burton.

A  carnivorous dinosaur from the triassic period was named Gojirasaurus in 1997. The main-belt asteroid 101781 Gojira, discovered by American astronomer Roy Tucker at the Goodricke-Pigott Observatory in 1999, was named in honor of the creature. The official naming citation was published by the Minor Planet Center on 11 July 2018. The largest megamullion, located 600 kilometres to the south-east of Okinotorishima, the southernmost Japanese island, is named the Godzilla Megamullion. The Japan Coast Guard played a role in name, reaching an agreement with Toho. Toho's Chief Godzilla officer Keiji Ota stated that "I am truly honored that (the megamullion) bears Godzilla's name, the Earth's most powerful monster."

Cultural ambassador
In April 2015, the Shinjuku ward of Tokyo named Godzilla a special resident and official tourism ambassador to encourage tourism. During an unveiling of a giant Godzilla bust at Toho headquarters, Shinjuku mayor Kenichi Yoshizumi stated "Godzilla is a character that is the pride of Japan." The mayor extended a residency certificate to an actor in a rubber suit representing Godzilla, but as the suit's hands were not designed for grasping, it was accepted on Godzilla's behalf by a Toho executive. Reporters noted that Shinjuku ward has been flattened by Godzilla in three Toho movies.

References

Sources

External links

 Official Godzilla website by Toho Co., Ltd
 Official website of Toho Co., Ltd (Japanese)
 Godzilla on IMDb

Animated characters
Fictional dragonslayers
Film characters introduced in 1954
Fictional characters with accelerated healing
Fictional characters with electric or magnetic abilities
Fictional characters with nuclear or radiation abilities
Fictional characters with superhuman strength
Fictional prehistoric characters
Fictional foster carers
Fictional dinosaurs
Fictional dragons
Fictional reptiles
Fictional giants
Fictional mass murderers
Fictional mutants
Fictional sea monsters
Fictional telepaths
Godzilla characters
Horror film villains
Kaiju
King Kong (franchise) characters
Science fiction film characters
Toho monsters